This is a timeline documenting events of Jazz in the year 1964.

Events

July
 2 – The 11th Newport Jazz Festival started in Newport, Rhode Island (July 2 – 5).

Album releases

Albert Ayler: Witches and Devils
John Coltrane: Crescent
Eric Dolphy: Out to Lunch!
Guenter Hampel: Heartplants
Herbie Hancock: Empyrean Isles
Joe Henderson: "Our Thing (album)"
Andrew Hill: Judgement!
Andrew Hill: Black Fire
Freddie Hubbard
Breaking Point
"Doin' the Thang!"
"The Body & the Soul"
Lee Morgan: The Sidewinder
Lee Morgan: Search For The New Land
New York Art Quartet: New York Art Quartet
Duke Pearson: Wahoo!
Oscar Peterson
Canadiana Suite
"The Oscar Peterson Trio Plays"
Trio Plus One
"We Get Requests"
André Previn: My Fair Lady
Shirley Scott: Blue Flames
Tony Scott: Music for Zen Meditation
Wayne Shorter: JuJu
Ben Webster: See You at the Fair
Tony Williams: Life Time
Larry Young: Into Somethin'
Denny Zeitlin
Carnival
Cathexis

Standards

Deaths 

 January
 4 – Artie Bernstein, American upright bassist (born 1909).
 5 – Cecil Scott, American clarinetist, tenor saxophonist, and bandleader (born 1905).
 9 – Big Boy Goudie, American saxophonist (born 1899).
 15 – Jack Teagarden, American trombonist and singer (born 1905).

 February
 9 – Willie Bryant, American bandleader, vocalist, and disc jockey (born 1908).

 May
 1 – Håkan von Eichwald, Finnish-Swedish bandleader and conductor (born 1908).
 7 – Joe Maini, American alto saxophonist (born 1930).

 June
 29 – Eric Dolphy, American alto saxophonist, flautist, and bass clarinetist (born 1928).

 July
 10 – Joe Haymes, American drummer, pianist, bandleader, and arranger (born 1907).

 October
 7 – Nick Travis, American trumpeter (born 1925).
 8 – Conrad Gozzo, American trumpeter (born 1922). 
 15 – Cole Porter, American composer and songwriter (born 1891).

 November
 5 – Buddy Cole, American pianist and orchestra leader (born 1916).
 19 – Vi Burnside, American saxophonist and bandleader (born 1915).
  30 – Don Redman, American arranger, bandleader, saxophonist, and clarinetist (born 1900).

 December
 11 – Sam Cooke, American singer, songwriter, and entrepreneur (born 1931).
 14 – Francisco Canaro, Uruguayan violinist and tango orchestra leader (born 1888).
 28 – Dave Bowman, American pianist (born 1914).

Births

 January
 18 – Andy Panayi, British saxophonist and flautist.
 27 – Trond Sverre Hansen, Norwegian drummer.

 February
 1 – Bugge Wesseltoft, Norwegian pianist and keyboardist.
 9 – Liane Carroll, English vocalist, pianist, and keyboardist.
 20 – Iain Ballamy, British composer, and soprano, alto and tenor saxophonist.
 29 – Martin France, English drummer.

 March
 10 – Neneh Cherry, Swedish singer-songwriter.
 13 – Reidar Skår, Norwegian keyboardist, composer, and music producer.
 18 – Courtney Pine, British saxophonist.
 30 – Tracy Chapman, American singer-songwriter and guitarist.

 April
 13 – Tetuzi Akiyama, Japanese guitarist, violinist, and instrument-maker.
 16 – Esbjörn Svensson, Swedish pianist, e.s.t (died 2008).
 22 – Johannes Eick, Norwegian bassist.
 26 – Rebecka Törnqvist, Swedish singer.

 May
 4 – Terje Isungset, Norwegian drummer and percussionist.
 13 – Harald Devold, Norwegian saxophonist (died 2016).
 31 – Carl Petter Opsahl, Norwegian saxophonist, clarinetist, and journalist.

 June
 8 – Fabrizio Cassol, Belgian saxophonist.
 9 – Wayman Tisdale, American basketball player and bass guitarist (died 2009).
 10 – Jimmy Chamberlin, American drummer, The Smashing Pumpkins.
 11 – Antti Sarpila, Finnish clarinetist.
 13 – Helge Lilletvedt, Norwegian pianist.
 21 – Philippe Aerts, Belgian upright bassist.
 28 – Steve Williamson, English saxophonist and composer.

 July
 13 – Brent Fischer, American bass guitarist and percussionist.
 15 – Tobias Delius, English tenor saxophonist and clarinetist.

 August
 10 – Kåre Kolve, Norwegian saxophonist.
 13 – Werner Neumann, German guitarist.
 28 – Peter Washington, American upright bassist.

 September
 1 – Dave O'Higgins, English saxophonist and composer.
 9 – Cæcilie Norby, Danish singer.
 11 – Victor Wooten, American bassist.
 16 – Phillip Bent, English flautist.
 23 – Yutaka Shiina, Japanese pianist and composer.
 25 – Barbara Dennerlein, German organist.

 October
 4 – Robert Hurst, American bassist.
 27 – Scotty Barnhart, American trumpeter, Count Basie Orchestra.
 29 – Mats Gustafsson, Swedish saxophonist.

 November
 16 – Diana Krall, Canadian pianist and singer.
 19 – Vincent Herring, American saxophonist and flautist.
 28 – Jesse Cook, Canadian guitarist. 

 December
 5 – Arve Furset, Norwegian pianist and keyboardist.
 12 – Mark Mondesir, English drummer.
 29 – Ramón Valle, Cuban pianist and composer.

 Unknown date
 Benita Haastrup, Danish drummer, percussionist, educator, and composer.
 Dennis Rollins, English trombonist and bandleader.

See also

 1960s in jazz
 List of years in jazz
 1964 in music

References

Bibliography

External links 
 History Of Jazz Timeline: 1964 at All About Jazz

Jazz
Jazz by year